Muhammad Arif Fadzilah bin Abu Bakar (born 20 April 1996) is a Malaysian professional footballer who plays as a left-back for Malaysia Super League club Terengganu.

International career
On 23 September 2021, Arif received his first call-up to the Malaysia national team, for central training and friendly matches against Jordan and Uzbekistan.

Career statistics

Club

International

References

External links
 

1996 births
Living people
Malaysian footballers
People from Terengganu
Terengganu F.C. II players
Terengganu FC players
Felda United F.C. players
Malaysia Super League players
Malaysian people of Malay descent
Association football defenders